The 2007 National League Championship Series (NLCS), the final round of the 2007 National League playoffs, began on October 11 and ended on October 15. It was a best-of-seven series, with the West Division champion Arizona Diamondbacks facing the wild card Colorado Rockies, also from the West Division. The Rockies swept the series in four games to win their first ever pennant, extending a 17–1 run to 21–1 in the process. The Rockies won the opportunity to play the American League champion Boston Red Sox in the 2007 World Series. Colorado's NLCS sweep was only the second NLCS sweep since the seven-game format was adopted in 1985, with the first being the Atlanta Braves' sweep in 1995.

The Rockies had swept the Philadelphia Phillies in three games in the NL Division Series, while the Diamondbacks had swept the Chicago Cubs. The Diamondbacks had home-field advantage due to winning the division. The series marked the first time the Rockies ever advanced to the NLCS and the second time for the Diamondbacks, in the first postseason matchup between the two teams; the Rockies' only prior postseason appearance was in 1995. It was the first time that two West Division teams had ever met in the NLCS, only the second to feature expansion franchises (the first being 1986) and the first of only two postseason meetings of any kind between teams that joined MLB in the 1990s (the other meeting being the 2017 Wild Card Game between the same two clubs).

The series was telecast on TBS, the first time a League Championship Series was ever shown exclusively on a cable network.

The Rockies would go on to lose in a sweep to the Boston Red Sox in the World Series in four games.

Summary

Arizona Diamondbacks vs. Colorado Rockies

Game summaries

Game 1
Thursday, October 11, 2007 at Chase Field in Phoenix, Arizona

The Rockies took a 1–0 series lead behind a strong  innings from starter Jeff Francis. Arizona scored first when Stephen Drew singled with one out in the first and scored on Eric Byrnes's RBI double, but the Rockies tied the game in the second when they loaded the bases off of Brandon Webb on two hits and a walk with no outs and Troy Tulowitzki hit into a double play that scored Todd Helton. Next inning, Willy Taveras singled with one out, stole second, and scored on Kazuo Matsui's RBI single. Matt Holliday then singled before Helton lined out to center. A wild pitch and walk loaded the bases, and Brad Hawpe's two-run single made it 4-1 Rockies. In the seventh, reliever Juan Cruz issued a leadoff walk to Yorvit Torrealba, who moved to second on a wild pitch and then to third on Francis's sacrifice bunt. After Taveras struck out, Diamondbacks first baseman Conor Jackson's fielding error on Matsui's ground ball allowed Torrealba to score to make it 5-1 Rockies. In the bottom of the inning, Francis allowed a leadoff double to Chris Snyder and hit Justin Upton with a pitch, but the Diamondbacks were taken out of a potential rally when a disputed interference call resulted in a double-play groundout for Augie Ojeda. Chase Field patrons responded by throwing objects onto the playing field, briefly stopping play. Though they loaded the bases on Jeff Cirillo's bunt single and Chris Young's walk off of reliever Matt Herges, Jeremy Affeldt got Drew to fly out to right to end the inning. Pinch hitter Miguel Montero singled with two outs in the bottom of the ninth off of Manny Corpas, but was tagged out at second to end the game.

Game 2
Friday, October 12, 2007 at Chase Field in Phoenix, Arizona

The Rockies struck first in Game 2 off of Diamondbacks' starter Doug Davis when Todd Helton reached on third baseman Mark Reynolds's ground ball fielding error, moved to third on Brad Hawpe's single two outs later, and scored on Yorvit Torrealba's single. The Diamondbacks tied it in the third when Davis hit a leadoff double off of Ubaldo Jiménez and scored on Chris Young's single. Willy Taveras walked to lead off the fifth off of Davis and moved to second on Kazuo Matsui's single. Matt Holliday's fly out moved the runners up one base before Helton's sacrifice fly put the Rockies up 2-1. In the bottom of the ninth, Manny Corpas hit Young with a pitch with one out and subsequently allowed a single to Stephen Drew. Eric Byrnes grounded to third baseman Matsui, who made an errant throw to second, allowing Young to score and tie the game, but unaware of this, Drew wandered off second base, allowing shortstop Troy Tulowitzski to tag him out at third. Tony Clark grounded out to send the game into extra innings. Jose Valverde retired the Rockies in order in the 10th, but in the 11th, allowed a single and two walks to load the bases with two outs before walking Taveras to put the Rockies up 3-2. Doug Slaten in relief got Matsui to line out to right to end the inning, but Ryan Speier, in relief of Corpas, retired the Diamondbacks in order in the bottom of the inning to end the game and put the Rockies up 2-0 in the series shifting to Coors Field.

Game 3
Sunday, October 14, 2007 at Coors Field in Denver, Colorado

The Rockies moved to within one win of the World Series for the first time in franchise history by winning Game 3 by a score of 4–1. Matt Holliday gave them a 1–0 lead in the first with a two-out solo home run off Arizona starter Liván Hernández, but Mark Reynolds tied the game in the fourth with a tape measure home run to left off of Josh Fogg. The decisive blow was delivered in the bottom of the sixth when Yorvit Torrealba battled in an eight-pitch at-bat to drive a three-run home run to left field off of Hernandez that sent Coors Field into a frenzy. Memorably, Torrealba pumped his fist in the air while rounding second base. The Rockies now held a 3–0 lead in the series. Despite them eventually sweeping Arizona, this was the only game where they outhit them.

Game 4
Monday, October 15, 2007 at Coors Field in Denver, Colorado

The Rockies won their first pennant in franchise history with a 6–4 win in Game 4, completing a sweep of the number one seed Arizona Diamondbacks. The Diamondbacks struck first when Micah Owings singled to lead off the third off of starter Franklin Morales, moved to second two outs later on a walk, and scored on Conor Jackson's single. The Rockies struck back with a six-run fourth inning. Owings walked Brad Hawpe and Troy Tulowitzski with one out. Yorvit Torrealba's ground out moved them one base each before pinch hitter Seth Smith's two-run bloop double down the left-field line one out later put the Rockies up 2-1. Arizona first baseman Jackson's fielding error allowed Willy Taveras to reach base and move Smith to third. Kazuo Matsui's single scored Smith before NLCS MVP Matt Holliday's three-run home run to deep center put the Rockies up 6-1. Juan Cruz and Brandon Lyon held them hitless for the rest of the game. Brian Fuentes allowed a leadoff single to Stephen Drew in the eighth, then another single to Jackson one out later before Chris Snyder cut the Rockies lead to 6-4 with a two-out, three-run home run to left that stayed just fair. After Justin Upton tripled, Manny Corpas then came on and struck out Tony Clark to end the inning. Corpas allowed a one-out double to Young in the ninth, but got Drew to pop out to second and Eric Byrnes, the center of controversy before Game 3, to hit a check-swing roller to Troy Tulowitzki, who fired to Todd Helton at first to retire the diving Byrnes and send Colorado to the 2007 World Series against the Boston Red Sox. No team had ever swept their way to the World Series since the Division Series began in 1995. Colorado was also the first team to have a 7–0 start to a postseason since the 1976 Cincinnati Reds finished the playoffs 7–0 sweeping both the LCS and World Series. Colorado also became the fourth 2nd place team to beat the team that won their division in the playoffs, joining the ‘97 Florida Marlins, ‘04 Boston Red Sox, and the ‘05 Houston Astros. In subsequent years, the ‘11 St. Louis Cardinals, ‘15 Chicago Cubs, and ‘20 Houston Astros would join this list.

Composite box
2007 NLCS (4–0): Colorado Rockies over Arizona Diamondbacks

Aftermath
Over the course of 29 days in September through the middle of October, the Rockies won 21 games and lost just once, shocking the baseball world en route to the World Series. The Red Sox swept the Rockies in the World Series, but that did not tarnish the players' fond memories. Although the Rockies had talented players, led by team veteran Todd Helton, MVP candidate Matt Holliday, and rookie of the year candidate Troy Tulowitzki, what stood out about the team was their chemistry and togetherness. “Our winning streak, in a lot of ways, was the end product of our team chemistry,” starting pitcher Josh Fogg said during the ten-year anniversary in 2017. “I mean, we’d have an off day on the road and 18 or 20 guys would go out to dinner together. That just doesn’t happen. Baseball is kind of a cutthroat game. And some people will root against their teammates so they can get themselves ahead in the game. I don’t think that played out at all in 2007. Everyone knew their job and knew their role. They were comfortable in it.” The Rockies run in 2007 was nicknamed “Rocktober” — a play off the Rockies team name and October.

The 2007 Rockies also proved to be a one-season anomaly. The team made the playoffs in 2009, but were defeated by the Phillies in the NLDS in a re-match of the 2007 NLDS. From 2008-2016, the Rockies were a cumulative 120 games under .500.

The Diamondbacks and Rockies met again in the postseason during the 2017 National League Wild Card game, with the Diamondbacks winning by a score of 11-8. To date, 2007 was the only time the Diamondbacks and Rockies finished 1–2 in the standings of the National League West. This was also the first time two NL West teams met in an NLCS, and as of 2022, it is the only time this has occurred.

To date, 2007 was also the last NL Championship appearance for either the Rockies or Diamondbacks.

Notes

External links
 League Championship Series | MLB.com: World Series
 MLB names League Championship Series umpires | MLB.com: Official Info
 2007 NLCS at Baseball Reference

National League Championship Series
National League Championship Series
Colorado Rockies postseason
Arizona Diamondbacks postseason
National League Championship Series
National League Championship Series
2000s in Denver
2000s in Phoenix, Arizona
National League Championship Series
Baseball competitions in Denver
Baseball competitions in Phoenix, Arizona